Karim Florent Laghouag (born  4 August 1975) is a French Olympic equestrian. He represented his country at the 2016 Summer Olympics, where he won the gold medal in the team eventing and finished 28th individually with the horse Entebbe.

Laghouag participated at two World Equestrian Games (in 2006 and 2010) and at three European Eventing Championships (in 2009, 2013 and 2015). He won team bronze medals in 2013 and 2015. Meanwhile, his biggest individual achievement is 10th place from 2006 World Games held in Aachen, Germany

References 

1975 births
Living people
French male equestrians
Equestrians at the 2016 Summer Olympics
Equestrians at the 2020 Summer Olympics
Olympic equestrians of France
Olympic gold medalists for France
Olympic bronze medalists for France
Olympic medalists in equestrian
Medalists at the 2016 Summer Olympics
Medalists at the 2020 Summer Olympics
People from Nogent-le-Rotrou
Sportspeople from Eure-et-Loir